Ana, Anka (Анка) or Anča (Анча), was one of the daughters of Nicolae Alexandru, Prince of Wallachia and wife of the Serbian Emperor Stefan Uroš V. Her sister, Anna, was the wife of Bulgarian Emperor Ivan Stratsimir.

She most likely married Uroš in the summer of 1360. She took monastic vows, becoming a nun, and adopted the name Jelena.

References

14th-century Serbian royalty
Medieval Serbian royal consorts
14th-century births
14th-century deaths
House of Basarab
Romanian princesses
People of the Serbian Empire